Cagnotto is an Italian surname. Notable people with the surname include:

Giorgio Cagnotto (born 1947), Italian Olympic diver 
Tania Cagnotto (born 1985), Italian Olympic diver, daughter of Giorgio

Italian-language surnames